Robert Cunliffe may refer to:

Sports
Robert Cunliffe (cricketer) (born 1973), English cricketer
Bobby Cunliffe (footballer, born 1928) (1928–2000), winger for Manchester City, Chesterfield and Southport
Bobby Cunliffe (footballer, born 1945), inside forward for Manchester City and York City
Robert Cunliffe (rower) (born 1950), Canadian Olympic rower

Politicians and baronets
Robert Cunliffe (MP) (died 1653), English politician
Sir Robert Cunliffe, 5th Baronet (1839–1905), English Liberal politician
Sir Robert Cunliffe, 2nd Baronet (1719–1778), of the Cunliffe baronets
Sir Robert Henry Cunliffe, 4th Baronet (1785–1859), of the Cunliffe baronets
Sir Robert Neville Henry Cunliffe, 7th Baronet (1884–1949), of the Cunliffe baronets
Robert Cunliffe (Royal Navy officer) (1895–1990), British commodore

See also
Cunliffe (surname)